Mina Mugil Kimes (born September 8, 1985) is an American journalist who specializes in business and sports reporting. She has written for Fortune, Bloomberg News, and ESPN. She is a senior writer at ESPN and an analyst on NFL Live.

Early life
Kimes was born September 8, 1985, in Omaha, Nebraska. Her father served in the United States Air Force as a captain. Kimes is of Korean descent on her mother's side.

Kimes moved to Arizona with her family during her teenage years. She attended Mesquite High School in Gilbert, Arizona. She graduated summa cum laude from Yale University in 2007 with a Bachelor of Arts in English.

Career

Business journalism 
Kimes's first position after college was at Fortune Small Business Magazine in 2007. As a business journalist, she won awards from the New York Press Club, the National Press Club, and the Asian American Journalists Association, amongst other places. Her 2012 investigation entitled Bad to the Bone exposed the unauthorized use of a cement to repair bone tissue, with lethal consequences, for which she won the Henry R. Luce Award. The Columbia Journalism Review included her exposés among its business must-reads for 2012. In 2014, she received the Larry Birger Young Business Journalist Prize from the Society of American Business Editors and Writers.

She joined Bloomberg News in 2013 as an investigative reporter. Her profiles of business executives Doug Oberhelman of Caterpillar, in a piece titled King Kat, and Sears executive Eddie Lampert, in a piece titled The Sun Tzu at Sears, won her the Front Page Award for business reporting.

ESPN
Kimes was offered a position by ESPN editors in 2014 after she wrote an essay on Tumblr about a "bond between herself and her dad and the Seattle Seahawks." At ESPN, she has written about young sports superstars, such as University of Houston basketball player Devonta Pollard. She has written profiles of NFL players Aaron Rodgers, Darrelle Revis, Tyrod Taylor, Antonio Brown, Baker Mayfield, and Michael and Martellus Bennett, and wrote a feature on Korean League of Legends star Faker. She co-wrote with Jeff Passan a piece on sexual harassment claims against former New York Mets GM Jared Porter.

Kimes is an active panelist on Around The Horn and has appeared on First Take, Highly Questionable, The Dan Le Batard Show with Stugotz, Pardon the Interruption, Debateable, and High Noon. She hosts an NFL-focused podcast entitled The Mina Kimes Show featuring Lenny, a reference to her dog.

From October 2019 until July 2020, Kimes hosted ESPN Daily, a daily news podcast. On June 30, 2020, Kimes was announced as an NFL analyst for ESPN's relaunch of NFL Live for the 2020 NFL season.

Other work 
In 2019, Kimes was hired by the Los Angeles Rams to be a color commentator for their preseason football games.

Kimes was a co-host, along with Amanda Dobbins, of The Ringer's "Big Little Live" after-show about the HBO series Big Little Lies.

In November 2020, Kimes helped celebrity chef David Chang become the first celebrity to win the $1 million prize on ABC's Who Wants to Be a Millionaire as the phone-a-friend lifeline on the million-dollar question.

Personal life 
Kimes married Nick Sylvester in 2015. They live in Los Angeles with their dog Lenny.

She has expressed her support for the Seattle Seahawks, in part due to her father being from Seattle.

References

External links

1985 births
21st-century American journalists
21st-century American women writers
American business writers
American investigative journalists
American journalists of Asian descent
American sports journalists
American sportswriters
American women journalists
American writers of Korean descent
ESPN people
Journalists from New York City
Living people
People from Brooklyn
People from Omaha, Nebraska
Women sports journalists
Writers from Nebraska
Yale University alumni
American women sportswriters